Ruan Jun (born 29 June 1997) is a Chinese footballer currently playing as a forward for China League Two club Tai'an Tiankuang.

Career statistics

Club
.

References

1997 births
Living people
People from Mianyang
Footballers from Sichuan
Chinese footballers
Association football forwards
China League Two players
China League One players
Sichuan Jiuniu F.C. players